Sir Richard Wapshare,  was a British-Indian Lieutenant General who served in World War I and participated in the Battle of Tanga and the Battle of Jassin. He also participated in the Operations against the Marri and Khetran tribes in 1918.

Biography
Richard was born on January 1860 as the final son of William Henry and Emma Elizabeth in Ooty. He began his education in Germany and in February 1880 became a gazetted lieutenant in the Royal Marine Light Infantry, however in November 1882 transferred to the 14th Native Infantry of the Bombay Army.In 1884 the British Indian Army officer transferred to the Hyderabad Contingent where he would remain for the rest of his regimental service. After completion of the latter he served in the 4th Cavalry and 3rd Cavalry regiments and participated in the Third Anglo-Burmese War.

In 1906,he was Assistant Adjutant-General at the Army Headquarters at Simla and remained there until 1910 when he was assigned to the Saugor Cavalry School. In 1912 he joined the Secunderabad Cavalry and later in the year transferred to the Bangalore Brigade. When World War I broke out, Wapshare served in the East African campaign as part of the Indian Expeditionary Force. The major general commanded the brigade in the Battle of Tanga, ending in a British defeat. He was described by Richard Meinertzhagen as a "dear fatherly old gentleman, kind and considerate" but "he has little military instinct and is nervous of all responsibility, maybe because he is hopelessly ignorant on all subjects connected to his profession." Wapshare then participated in the Battle of Jassin only to end in another British defeat. Later, back in India, he participated in the Operations against the Marri and Khetran tribes and the Third Anglo-Afghan War and retired in 1925. He died on 23 December 1932 in Cheltenham.

References

Further reading
'Despatch by Lieutenant-General R. Wapshare, C.B., C.S.I. on the Organization and Working of the East Persian

1860 births
1932 deaths
Indian Army generals of World War I
British military personnel of the Third Anglo-Burmese War
Knights Companion of the Order of the Bath
Companions of the Order of the Indian Empire
Companions of the Order of the Star of India
British military personnel of the Third Anglo-Afghan War
People from Ooty
British Indian Army generals
Royal Marines officers